Johann Carl Hermann Kotzschmar (July 4, 1829April 15, 1908) was a German-American musician, conductor, and composer.

Kotzschmar was born in 1829 in Finsterwalde, Germany. His father, Johann Gottfried Kotzschmar, was the town Stadtmusiker and taught his son to play the violin, keyboard, flute, and horn. At age 14, Kotzschmar went to Dresden to study with Julius Otto, a choral conductor who was the cantor at the Kreuzkirche, Dresden. He studied with Otto for five years, then emigrated to America with a group of other musicians from Dresden who called themselves the Saxonia Band. The group toured New York and Philadelphia with Fry's Italian Opera, then split up when the show folded in Boston.

While in Boston, Kotzschmar met Cyrus Libby Curtis, an amateur musician from Portland, Maine, who suggested he move there to find work. Kotzschmar arrived in Portland in July 1849 and lived with the Curtis family for his first year there. In June 1850, Curtis' first son was born and named Cyrus Hermann Kotzschmar Curtis, in Kotzschmar's honor.

In 1851, Kotzschmar was hired to be the organist at the First Parish Church in Portland, where his ashes reside. It was a position he would keep for 47 years. While living in Portland, Kotzschmar was very active as a composer, conductor, and performer. As an organist, he was well known for his improvisational skills. He was also a noted pianist and accompanist. He composed music for a variety of instruments and ensembles and in a variety of formats.

In addition to his position at the First Parish Church, Kotzschmar's other major professional collaboration was as the conductor of the Haydn Association. This group of singers first came together in 1869 to present Haydn's Creation. After the success of this performance, they decided to form a permanent group called the Haydn Association or, informally, the Haydns.

In December 1872, Kotzschmar married one of his former piano students, Mary Ann Torrey, on her 19th birthday. The couple had two children.

In 1898, Kotzschmar left his positions at both the First Parish Church and the Haydn Association. He took a position at the State Street Congregational Church and worked there until 1903.

Hermann Kotzschmar died on April 15, 1908, at the age of 78, from a cerebral hemorrhage. Earlier that year, a fire had destroyed the Portland City Hall. When a new city hall was built, Cyrus Hermann Kotzschmar Curtis, having become a wealthy publisher, donated an organ for an auditorium in the building, on the condition that it be a memorial to Hermann Kotzschmar. The Kotzschmar Memorial Organ was dedicated on August 22, 1912.

Hermann Kotzchamar's legacy includes two students who left an indelible mark on American music and music education, John Knowles Paine, American's first composer of large scale orchestral works and America's first music professor, and Cyrus H. K. Curtis, who, having become one of America's richest men publishing magazines including the Ladies' Home Journal and The Saturday Evening Post, became a music philanthropist who donated several important organs, funded the early Philadelphia Orchestra, and provided, through his daughter's memorial gifts, the Curtis Institute of Music.

Further reading

Thornton-Edwards, George. Music and Musicians of Maine. Portland Maine: Southworth Press, 1928.

Parkinson-Tucker, Janice. Hermann Kotzschmar: An Appreciation. South Portland, Maine: Casco House Publishing, 2006.

Parkinson-Tucker, Janice. Behind the Pipes: the Story of the Kotzschmar Organ. South Portland, Maine: Casco House Publishing, 2005.

References

External links
 
 Sheet music for Kotzschmar's "Te Deum", G. Schirmer, 1866.

1829 births
1908 deaths
German emigrants to the United States
People from Finsterwalde
Musicians from Portland, Maine
19th-century German musicians
19th-century German male musicians